Putzgruppe (Cleaning Squad) was a German left-wing group, that emerged from the German student movement and was active in the 1970s. It participated in riots against the police.
According to Daniel Cohn-Bendit, they tried "to use helmets, to protect themselves against the state power, which sought trouble". The group was the militant branch of a left-wing political organisation called "Revolutionärer Kampf" (Revolutionary Fight). The future German foreign minister Joschka Fischer was known to be the head of this group.
The term Putzgruppe became popular in Germany in 2000, when the trial against Hans-Joachim Klein, a former member of the group, begun. He joined the terrorist Revolutionary Cells in 1974.

The groups usual area of operation was the violent defense of occupied buildings against eviction by the police. In 2001 Joschka Fischer gave an interview to the German magazine Stern, in which he said that they threw stones. Furthermore, the group may be responsible for the use of Molotov cocktails on a demonstration in May 1976 when the policeman Jürgen Weber suffered severe burns.

References

Außerparlamentarische Opposition
Autonomism
Far-left politics in Germany
Left-wing militant groups in Germany